The Ningbo Ring Expressway, designated as G1504, is ring expressway in Ningbo, Zhejiang, China. The Ningbo Ring Expressway is composed of east and west sections, with a total length of 85.63 kilometers and features 17 interchanges, 13 toll stations and 1 service area. The whole expressway was opened to traffic on 28 December 2011. It is known as the "golden ring line" of Ningbo.

Overview

West section
The west section of Ningbo Ring Expressway starts from Luotuo Street, Yanjiaqiao Village, Zhenhai District, and ends at Jiangshan Town, Yinzhou District, passing through Haishu District and Fenghua District, with a total length of 42.135 kilometers. It opened to traffic on 26 December 2007

East section
The eastern section of Ningbo Ring Expressway starts from Jiangshan Town, Yinzhou District, passes through Beilun District, and ends at Luotuo Street, Yanjiaqiao Village, Zhenhai District connected to the west section. Among them, the section from Baoguo Temple to Linjiang was opened to traffic ahead of schedule on 31 December 2010 while the rest of the east section opened to traffic on 28 December 2011 after the completion of the Qingshuipu Bridge.

References

Chinese national-level expressways
Expressways in Zhejiang
Transport in Ningbo